Tsurumaki (written: 鶴巻 or 弦巻) is a Japanese surname. Notable people with the surname include:

, Japanese anime director
, Japanese footballer
Marc Tsurumaki, American architect
, Japanese mixed martial artist

Japanese-language surnames